The 1970 United States Senate election in Virginia was held on November 3, 1970. Incumbent Senator Harry F. Byrd Jr. was re-elected to his first full term after winning a race 4 years earlier to finish the remainder of his father's term.

Candidates
Harry F. Byrd Jr. (I), incumbent U.S. Senator
George C. Rawlings, Jr. (D), former member of the Virginia House of Delegates
Ray L. Garland (R), member of Virginia House of Delegates

Results

See also 
 1970 United States Senate elections

References

Virginia
1970
1970 Virginia elections